QSR may refer to: 

 QSR International, a qualitative research software developer based in Melbourne, Australia
 QSR, a standardized Q code initially developed for commercial radiotelegraph communication
 Quick service restaurant (also fast food restaurant), a specific type of restaurant that serves fast food cuisine and has minimal table service
 Restaurant Brands International (stock symbol: QSR), a Canadian multinational fast food holding company
 Salerno Costa d'Amalfi Airport (IATA code: QSR), an airport in southern Italy, near to Salerno